The Avro 562 Avis was a two-seat light biplane designed and built by the A.V.Roe and Company Limited at Hamble for the 1924 Lympne Light Aeroplane Trials.

Design and development
The Avis was a single-bay unstaggered biplane with full-span ailerons on both upper and lower wings. It had a fixed landing gear with a tailskid and could be powered by a nose-mounted 32 hp Bristol Cherub II engine or a 35 hp Blackburne Thrush radial piston engine. It had tandem open cockpits. First flown with the Thrush engine prior to the trials, it was refitted with the Cherub, and first flown with this engine  by Bert Hinkler at Lympne on 30 September 1924. On the next day it won the Grosvenor Cup at a speed of 65.87 mph.

For the 1926 trials it was re-engined with a 38 hp Blackburne Thrush, being eliminated after a forced landing. In 1927, it was re-engined again with a Bristol Cherub I and passed into private ownership until it was scrapped in 1931.

Specifications

See also

References

Notes

Bibliography

 Jackson, A.J. Avro Aircraft since 1908. London: Putnam Aeronautical Books 2nd edition, 1990. .
 Jackson, A.J. British Civil Aircraft since 1919, Volume 1.  London: Putnam, 1974. .

External links

 Avro Avis – British Aircraft Directory

1920s British sport aircraft
Avis
Aircraft first flown in 1924